Trichur V. Ramachandran(born 1940) is a Carnatic music vocalist. He received the most prestigious award of Madras Music Academy's Sangeetha Kalanidhi in 2012 from the Madras Music Academy.

He was born in 1940 in Thrissur, Cochin State. He gave his first concert at the age of 14 and was a disciple of G. N. Balasubramaniam. Later he underwent training under M L Vasanthakumari as part of an Indian government Cultural Scholarship. Ramachandran married Charumathi in 1973.

Ramachandran is recipient of Sangeet Natak Akademi Award in 2003. He also received the Padma Bhushan award from the Government of India in 2003. He also received the title of Sangeetha Choodamani by Sri Krishna Gana Sabha in 2001. Among plenty of titles and accolades, he is also the recipient of the Kerala Sangeetha Nataka Akademi Award in 1987 and Vidhya Tapasvi title from TAPAS Cultural Foundation in 2009.

.

References

External links

Endless passion for music
A tribute to a great musician
Trichur Ramachandran honoured
Biography of G N B, guru of Ramachandran
Trichur Ramachandran named Sangita Kalanidhi

Male Carnatic singers
Carnatic singers
Recipients of the Padma Bhushan in arts
Recipients of the Sangeet Natak Akademi Award
1940 births
Living people
Sangeetha Kalanidhi recipients
Singers from Thrissur
20th-century Indian male classical singers
21st-century Indian male classical singers
Recipients of the Kerala Sangeetha Nataka Akademi Award